A social edition is a form of textual scholarship that utilizes social media like Wikimedia or blogs to create annotated editions of texts. Crompton, Arbuckle and Siemens describe that "Using social media allows us to integrate a new stage into the editorial process — a stage that fills the gap between an edition’s initial planning stages and its concluding blind peer review, which capitalizes on the engaged knowledge communities inside and outside the academy".

List of social editions

Open participation 
Participation is open to registered and unregistered contributors.
 The Annotated The Tales of John Oliver Hobbes
 A Social Edition of the Devonshire MS

Semi-open participation 
Participation is allowed through a process of review by the project members.
 The Iraq Study Group Report

References

Further reading 

 Bryant, John, The Fluid Text. A Theory of Revision and Editing for Book and Screen. Ann Arbor, University of Michigan Press 2005 (2002).
 Shillingsburg, Peter L., From Gutenberg to Google. Electronic Representations of Literary Texts.  Cambridge University Press 2006.  
 Siemens, Ray, et al. "Toward modeling the social edition: An approach to understanding the electronic scholarly edition in the context of new and emerging social media." Literary and linguistic computing 27.4 (2012): 445–461. http://web.uvic.ca/~siemens/pub/2011-SocialEdition.pdf
 Gunter Vasold: Work-in-Progress-Editionen als multidimensionale Wissensräume, in: Digital Diplomatics. The Computer as a Tool for the Diplomatist? Ed. by Antonella Ambrosio, Sébastien Barret, and Georg Vogeler, Köln et al.: Böhlau, 2014 (AfD Beiheft 14). (Slides from the presentation at the Digital Diplomatics 2013, Naples 1st Oct. 2014)